Love Court is a Canadian reality television series that aired on MuchMusic from August 28, 2009 to February 26, 2010. The series was hosted by recording artist Elise Estrada and was cancelled after 21 episodes due to a repurposing of the network.

Format
In a typical episode, two people would be set up to go on a date with each other. Date events were planned for them and everything was taped by (often hidden) cameras. Unbeknownst to the two people, at the end of the date they would be brought before a panel of judges recruited from juror regulars of Video on Trial (Dini Dimakos, Eddie Della Siepe, Andrew Johnston and Darrin Rose) and a winner would be declared, given a cash prize ranging from $500 – $1000.

Episodes

References

Much (TV channel) original programming
2009 Canadian television series debuts
2009 Canadian television series endings
2000s Canadian reality television series
Canadian dating and relationship reality television series